Grovetown is a small town in Marlborough, New Zealand. State Highway 1 runs past the settlement to the west, and the Wairau River flows past to the northeast. Spring Creek is about 2.5 km to the north, and Blenheim is about 3.5 km to the south. To the east is Grovetown Lagoon, an oxbow loop of the Wairau River. The settlement had a usual resident population of 357 at the 2018 New Zealand census.

Tua Mātene Marae is located in Grovetown. It is a marae (meeting ground) of Rangitāne o Wairau and includes Te Huataki wharenui (meeting house).

Demographics

Grovetown had a population of 357 at the 2018 New Zealand census, an increase of 57 people (19.0%) since the 2013 census, and an increase of 60 people (20.2%) since the 2006 census. There were 135 households. There were 177 males and 177 females, giving a sex ratio of 1.0 males per female, with 69 people (19.3%) aged under 15 years, 48 (13.4%) aged 15 to 29, 183 (51.3%) aged 30 to 64, and 57 (16.0%) aged 65 or older.

Ethnicities were 92.4% European/Pākehā, 13.4% Māori, 0.8% Pacific peoples, 2.5% Asian, and 0.8% other ethnicities (totals add to more than 100% since people could identify with multiple ethnicities).

Although some people objected to giving their religion, 60.5% had no religion, 28.6% were Christian, 0.8% were Buddhist and 3.4% had other religions.

Of those at least 15 years old, 39 (13.5%) people had a bachelor or higher degree, and 63 (21.9%) people had no formal qualifications. The employment status of those at least 15 was that 156 (54.2%) people were employed full-time, 39 (13.5%) were part-time, and 12 (4.2%) were unemployed.

Education
Grovetown School is a coeducational contributing primary (years 1-6) school with a roll of  The school was established in 1866.

References

Populated places in the Marlborough Region